Nebria latior is a species of ground beetle in the Nebriinae subfamily that is endemic to Kazakhstan.

References

latior
Beetles described in 1992
Beetles of Asia
Endemic fauna of Kazakhstan